Golet in the Valley is a 1995 Czech comedy-drama film directed by Zeno Dostál.

Cast
Ondřej Vetchý as Bajnyš Zisovič
Jan Hartl as Pinches Jakubovič
Jiří Ornest as Mojše Kahan
Mahulena Bočanová as Brana
Yvetta Blanarovičová as Rojza Bajnyšová
Jana Dolanská as Fajga Kahanová
Josef Kemr as Lejb Fajnerman
Ivan Řezáč as Tourist
Markéta Hrubešová as Lady

References

External links
 

1995 films
Czech comedy-drama films
1990s Czech-language films
Czech Lion Awards winners (films)
Golden Kingfisher winners
Films set in Czechoslovakia
Films about Jews and Judaism
Films about Orthodox and Hasidic Jews
1995 comedy-drama films